The Irish Countrywomen's Association (ICA) is the largest women's organisation in Ireland, with over 15,000 members. Founded in 1910 as the Society of United Irishwomen, it exists to prove social and educational opportunities for women and to improve the standard of rural and urban life in Ireland. Its central office is in Dublin. It is one of the oldest societies of its kind in the world.

History
Inspired by the work of Horace Plunkett, a first branch of the Society of United Irishwomen was founded in 1910 by Anita Lett in County Wexford, following by a second towards the end of that year. The wider association was established by a committee meeting at The Plunkett House, the headquarters of the Irish Agricultural Organisation Society, and including Ellice Pilkington, great-granddaughter of Henry Grattan, with the support of Horace Plunkett.  In 1935, the society changed its name to the Irish Countrywomen's Association to avoid any association with the nationalist United Ireland Party (now known as Fine Gael). 

Working against the rampant antifeminism of 20th-century Ireland, the association worked on teaching and promoting rural housewives to establish home industries, maintain a hygienic home, provide a healthy diet for their families, and take an active role in public and intellectual life. From its earliest days, the association was enthusiastic for the development of an Irish artistic and crafts identity. 

During the 20th century, the ICA was involved in the promotion of good health, education, and access to basic utilities throughout Ireland. It worked closely with the ESB Group during its roll-out of rural electrification in the 1950s and 1960s.

In 2022 a number of leaks were made to the Irish national media following the unexplained dismissable of three board members. From those leaks, accusations,emerged that money had been paid to a former President for 'home office rental' by the organisation since 2019.

Activities
The association runs courses in crafts and skills at its centre An Grianán in Termonfeckin, County Louth. The centre was purchased using funds secured by an ICA sub-committee on "residential courses", which was founded in 1953 and chaired by Máirín Beaumont. This centre was founded by Muriel Gahan and Kathleen Delap. The centre has a garden house named in honour of the ICA president who oversaw the plans for the centre in the years before it opened, Lucy Franks.

As of 2007, the organisation was campaigning on behalf of women who receive wrong cancer diagnoses, and in December 2007 it organised a meeting in Dublin of 1,100 women, one of a series of such meetings around Ireland.

Politics
Two of its former presidents, Kit Ahern and Peggy Farrell, were nominated by the Taoiseach to  serve in Seanad Éireann, the upper house of the Oireachtas (the Irish parliament). A third, Patsy Lawlor was elected to the Cultural and Educational Panel in 1981.

Leadership
Notable former presidents included Elizabeth Burke-Plunkett, Lucy Franks, Kit Ahern, Peggy Farrell and Patsy Lawlor.

References

Further reading
 Connolly, Linda (2003), The Irish Women’s Movement: from revolution to devolution, Dublin: Lilliput Press.

External links
ICA website

Countrywomen
Organizations established in 1910
Organisations based in Dublin (city)
1910 establishments in Ireland
Seanad nominating bodies